Southern Taiwan University of Science and Technology (STUST) is a private university in Yongkang District, Tainan, Taiwan.

History
The university was originally founded in 1969 as Nan-Tai Junior College of Engineering. In 1990, it became Nan-Tai Junior College of Engineering and Business. In 1996 it was upgraded to Nan-Tai Institute of Technology and again to Southern Taiwan University of Technology in 1999. In 2007 it was upgraded to Southern Taiwan University and in 2012 it became Southern Taiwan University of Science and Technology.

Administration

Chairman
Hsin-Hsiung Chang

Presidents
President Shin Wen-Bing (1969-1988)
President Chang Hsin-Hsiung (1989-2007)
President Tai Chein (2007-2017)
President Lu Deng-Maw (2017-Now)

Motto
The university's motto is Trust, justice, sincerity, honesty.

"Trust, justice, sincerity, and honesty are the basic principles of our lives. They are principles revered by ancient Eastern as well as by ancient Western sages. They are now regarded as our school motto. I hope all of us will strive to fulfill them." —Wen-Ping Hsin, 1969

Faculties
 College of Engineering
 College of Business
 College of Humanities and Social Sciences
 College of Digital Design

Chinese Language Center 
The Chinese Language Center at STUST was established for international students and visiting foreigners in Taiwan to help them learn Chinese as a foreign language.

Classes are offered depending on the learners’ needs. Currently, the center offers beginner and basic classes to assist learners in developing the four essential language skills: speech, listening, writing, and reading.

Campus 
 = Buildings
 = Parking Lots
 = Pitches
 = Greenfield
 = Road in campus
 = Road outside campus

Buildings

Electrical Engineering Building I(A)
Electrical Engineering Building II(B)
Extension Education / Development Building(C)
Management & Information Technology Building(D)
Shin-Chi Building(E)
Information & Communication Building(F)
Chemical Engineering & Biotechnology Building(G)
Dormitory(H1,H2,H3,H5,H6)
Inter-school Alliance Industrial Technology & Practical Training Building(I)
Electronic Engineering Building II(J)
Mechanical Engineering Building(K)
Administration Building(L)
Humanities & Art Building(M)
Wen-Ping Building(N)
Electronic Engineering & Logistic Studies Building(P)
Electro-Optical Engineering Building(Q)
Automobile Engineering Building(R)
Automobile Workshop(R1)
Management Science Building(S)
Teaching & Research Building(T)
Yohas Center(U)
Energy Engineering Building(V)
Pang-Po Building(Ｗ)
Design Cube(X)
San-lian Gymnasium(Y)
Shim-Whai Memorial Hall(Z)

Transportation
The university is accessible from Daqiao Station of the Taiwan Railways.

See also
 List of universities in Taiwan

References

External links

University Website (English)  
華語中心 - Chinese Language Center (Multi-language)

1969 establishments in Taiwan
Educational institutions established in 1969
Universities and colleges in Tainan
Yongkang District
Scientific organizations based in Taiwan
Universities and colleges in Taiwan
Technical universities and colleges in Taiwan